The siege of Charleston was a major engagement and major British victory in the American Revolutionary War, fought in the environs of Charles Town (today Charleston), the capital of South Carolina, between March 29 and May 12, 1780. The British, following the collapse of their northern strategy in late 1777 and their withdrawal from Philadelphia in 1778, shifted their focus to the American Southern Colonies. After approximately six weeks of siege, Major General Benjamin Lincoln, commanding the Charleston garrison, surrendered his forces to the British. It was one of the worst American defeats of the war.

Background

By late 1779, two major British strategic efforts had failed. An army invading from Quebec under John Burgoyne had surrendered to the Americans under Horatio Gates at the Battles of Saratoga, which inspired both the Kingdom of France and Spain to declare war on Great Britain in support of the Americans. Meanwhile, a strategic effort led by Sir William Howe to capture the Revolutionary capital of Philadelphia had met with limited success. Having replaced his superior as Commander-in-Chief of the American Station, Sir Henry Clinton withdrew all his forces back to New York City to reinforce the city against a possible Franco-American attack.

Stymied by the Fabian strategy adopted by Continental general George Washington and, under increasing political pressure to deliver victory, the British turned to launching their "Southern Strategy" to force a capitulation of the Americans. The British were persuaded that there was a strong Loyalist sentiment in the South, where major planters and merchants had a variety of economic and familial ties with Great Britain. It was expected that these Loyalists would rise against the American Patriots in large numbers. The opening British action was the Capture of Savannah, Georgia in December 1778. After repulsing an assault on Savannah by a combined Franco-American force in October 1779, the British planned to capture Charleston, South Carolina, intending to use the city as a base for further operations in the southern colonies.

Clinton evacuated Newport, Rhode Island in October 1779, and left the substantial garrison of New York City under the command of Wilhelm von Knyphausen. In December, the day after Christmas 1779, Clinton and his second-in-command, Charles Cornwallis, sailed southward with 8,500 troops and 5,000 sailors on 90 troopships and 14 warships.  After a very stormy voyage, the fleet anchored in the Savannah River on 1 February 1780.  By 12 February, Clinton had landed his army 30 miles south of Charleston on Simmons Island.  By 24 February, the British had crossed the Stono River onto James Island, and by 10 March, Lord Cornwallis had made it to the mainland.  By 22 March, they had advanced to Middleton Place and Drayton Hall, and on 29 March 1780, crossed the Ashley River.

Clinton had issued the Philipsburg Proclamation in 1779, promising freedom for slaves owned by Patriots who escaped to British lines and aided their cause. Slaves left both the city and countryside around Charleston to join the British around the city. Among those former slaves, known as Black Loyalists, evacuated by the British after the war was John Kizell, who had been captured as a child from the area of Sierra Leone and transported to South Carolina. He eventually returned to Sierra Leone and aided the American Colonization Society.

Siege

Cutting the city off from relief, Clinton began a siege on 1 April, 800 yards from the American fortifications located at today's Marion Square.  Whipple, deciding the bar was indefensible, scuttled his fleet at the mouth of the Cooper River.  Then Arbuthnot, on 8 April, brought his 14 vessels safely into the harbor, past the roaring guns of Fort Moultrie, the same day Woodford arrived with 750 Virginia Continentals.

In order to consolidate British control of the immediate area, Clinton dispatched Banastre Tarleton and Patrick Ferguson to capture Monck's Corner on 14 April.  On 18 April, Lt. Col. Lord Rawdon arrived with 2,500 men, including the 42nd Highlanders, the Hessian von Ditfurth Regiment, the Queen's Rangers, Prince of Wales American Volunteers, and the Volunteers of Ireland.  Charleston was completely surrounded by the British.

Governor John Rutledge escaped on 13 April.  On 21 April, Continental leader Benjamin Lincoln requested a surrender with "honours of war", which was rejected by Clinton.  On 23 April, Lord Cornwallis crossed the Cooper River with the Volunteers of Ireland and Carolina Tory militia, joining Lt. Col. James Webster's 33rd Foot and 64th Foot, blocking further escape from the left bank.  On 25 April, civilians led by Christopher Gadsden prevented any action on Lincoln's part in withdrawing the Continental regiments.  On 6 May, Tarleton won another engagement in the Battle of Lenud's Ferry, while the British siege works had advanced far enough towards the Charleston fortifications to drain the canal in front.

On 7 May, Fort Moultrie surrendered without a fight. On May 8, Clinton called for Lincoln's unconditional surrender, but Lincoln attempted to negotiate for the honours of war. On May 11, Gadsden and other citizens asked Lincoln to surrender.  On the same day, the British fired heated shot into the city, burning several homes, and Lincoln felt forced to call for a parlay to negotiate terms for surrender. On May 12, Lincoln formally surrendered 3,371 men to the British.

When word reached the backcountry, the American troops holding Ninety-Six, South Carolina and Camden also surrendered to the British.

Aftermath
The British captured some 5,266 prisoners, 311 artillery pieces, 9,178 artillery rounds, 5,916 muskets, 33,000 rounds of ammunition, 15 Regimental colours, 49 ships and 120 boats, plus 376 barrels of flour, and large magazines of rum, rice and indigo. Following the surrender, the captured ordnance was brought to a powder magazine. A Hessian officer warned that some of the guns might still be loaded, but he was ignored. One prematurely fired, detonating 180 barrels of powder, further discharging 5,000 muskets in the magazine. The accident killed approximately 200 people and destroyed six houses. The prisoners of the siege were diverted to multiple locations, including prison ships, the old barracks where the College of Charleston is today (two barracks buildings are shown on early maps of the campus), and the Old Exchange and Provost "Dungeon". Prison hulks awaited the majority of the 2,571 Continental prisoners, while parole was granted to the militia and civilians who promised not to take up arms.  This ended the power of an American army in the South.

The defeat was a serious blow to the American cause. It was the largest surrender of an American force under arms until the 1862 surrender of Union troops at Harper's Ferry during the Antietam Campaign. The surrender left no substantial army in the South, and the colonies were wide open for a British advance. The British troops consolidated their hold, and had driven the remaining Continental Army troops from South Carolina consequent to the May 29 Battle of Waxhaws.

During their surrender the American forces were denied honours of war, leading General George Washington to deny the same to the British during their surrender at the Siege of Yorktown. Washington said, "The same Honors will be granted to the Surrendering Army as were granted to the Garrison of Charles Town."

On June 5, Clinton sailed back to New York City, believing his presence necessary to defend against a potential Franco-American attack, leaving command of the southern theater to Lord Cornwallis, with orders to reduce opposition in North Carolina. Though the effects of the surrender at Charleston were substantial, the British error in strategy soon became apparent. As no popular uprising of Loyalists took place, control of the countryside was difficult. Instead, resistance in South Carolina degenerated into a period of chaotic guerrilla warfare in the outlying areas.

Order of battle

British forces
The joint British naval-army forces were led overall by Sir Henry Clinton, with his subordinate, Lord Cornwallis as his second-in-command. The British regular troops were led by Brigadier General Alexander Leslie.

The ground and naval forces were composed thus:

Franco-American forces
The Franco-American garrison of Charleston was overall led by Benjamin Lincoln. The Continental Army troops were nominally led by Brigadier General William Moultrie.

The ground and naval forces were composed thus:

Preservation
The American Battlefield Trust and its partners have acquired and preserved  of historic land in Charleston related to the siege.

See also

 List of American Revolutionary War battles
 American Revolutionary War § War in the South. Places ' Siege of Charleston ' in overall sequence and strategic context.

References
Footnotes

Citations

External links
 Original papers relating to the siege of Charleston, 1780 By Benjamin Lincoln 1898

Charleston
History of Charleston, South Carolina
Charleston
1780 in South Carolina
Conflicts in 1780
Charleston
Charleston
18th-century in Charleston, South Carolina